Malocampa confusa is a moth of the family Notodontidae. It is found in north-eastern Ecuador.

The length of the forewings is 21–25 mm. The ground colour of the forewings is silvery white with a fine suffusion of charcoal grey scales. The ground colour of the hindwings is light golden brown at the base and coppery grey-brown to the margin.

Etymology
The species name is derived from Latin confusionis and refers to the wing pattern resemblance between M. confusa and Malocampa bolivari.

References

Moths described in 2011
Notodontidae